The 1978–79 Michigan State Spartans men's basketball team represented Michigan State University in the 1978–79 NCAA Division I men's basketball season. The Spartans were coached by Jud Heathcote in his third year and played their home games at Jenison Field House in East Lansing, Michigan. They were members of the Big Ten Conference. The Spartans finished the season 26–6, 13–5 in Big Ten play to earn a share of the Big Ten championship. They received the conference's automatic bid to the NCAA tournament as the No. 2 seed in the Mideast region. They defeated Lamar, LSU, and No. 1-seeded Notre Dame to advance to the Final Four, only the school's second trip to the Final Four. They defeated Penn to advance to the national championship game where they defeated Indiana State to win the school's first national championship in basketball.

Previous season
The Spartans finished the 1977–78 season 25–5, 15–3 in Big Ten play to win the Big Ten championship. They beat Providence in the first round of the NCAA tournament and Western Kentucky in the Mideast Regional semifinal. However, they lost to Kentucky in the Regional Final.

Season summary
MSU was led by star sophomore, Earvin "Magic" Johnson (16.1 points, 7.4 rebounds, and 8.2 assists per game), senior Greg Kelser (18.1 points and 8.5 rebounds per game), and sophomore Jay Vincent (13.7 points and 5.6 rebounds per game). The Spartans started the season well, finishing the non-conference season with an 8–1 record including a loss to No. 13 ranked North Carolina. They entered conference play as the No. 1-ranked team in the country.

After winning their first two conference games, they lost four of their next six games to fall to a 4–4 record in the Big Ten, trailing first-place Ohio State by four games in the standings. However, Michigan State then won their next 10 games with wins over No. 7 Ohio State, at No. 15 Iowa, at No. 13 Ohio State, and No. 18 Purdue. A loss on the final day of the season to Wisconsin resulted in the Spartans slipping into a tie for the Big Ten championship with Iowa and Purdue. MSU received a bid to the NCAA tournament because of a better head-to-head performance against Big Ten rivals and a superior overall record (21–6). The Spartans finished the season ranked No. 3 in the country.

Michigan State advanced to the Final Four by defeating Lamar, LSU and No. 1-seeded Notre Dame. In the Final Four, the second Final Four appearance in school history, they faced Penn, blowing them out 101–67 to earn a trip to the Championship. There, the Spartans faced No. 1-ranked and undefeated Indiana State led by senior Larry Bird. In what was the most-watched college basketball game ever, Michigan State defeated Indiana State 75–64 to win the school's first ever basketball National Championship. Magic Johnson was voted Most Outstanding Player of the Final Four.

After two years in college, in which he averaged 17.1 points, 7.6 rebounds, and 7.9 assists per game, Johnson declared for the 1979 NBA draft.

Roster and stats

Source

Schedule and results 

|-
!colspan=9 style=| Regular season

|-
!colspan=9 style=|NCAA Tournament

Rankings

^Coaches did not release Week 1 or Week 2 polls.

Awards and honors
 Earvin "Magic" Johnson, Consensus All-American teams
 Earvin "Magic" Johnson, Chicago Tribune Silver Basketball
 Earvin "Magic" Johnson, All-Big Ten First Team
 Gregory Kelser, All-Big Ten First Team

Team players drafted into the NBA

Source

References

Michigan State Spartans men's basketball seasons
Michigan State
NCAA Division I men's basketball tournament championship seasons
NCAA Division I men's basketball tournament Final Four seasons
Michigan State
Michigan
Michigan